Ferruccio Biancini (18 August 1890 – 19 March 1955) was an Italian film actor, producer, screenwriter, and director. He appeared in 15 films between 1916 and 1950. He was born in Pomponesco, Lombardy and died in Rome.

Selected filmography

 Captain Fracasse (1919)
 The Shadow (1920)
 Theodora (1921)
 The White Sister (1923)
 The Shepherd King (1923)
 The Last Days of Pompeii (1926)
 One Night with You (1932)
 Paprika (1933)
 Model Wanted (1933)
 The Song of the Sun (1934)
 The Lucky Diamond (1934)
 White Amazons (1936)
 Mother Song (1937)
 Departure (1938)
 Maddalena, Zero for Conduct (1940)
 The Beggar's Daughter (1950)
 Wedding Night In Paradise (1950)
 The Phantom Musketeer (1952)
 A Parisian in Rome (1954)

References

External links

1890 births
1955 deaths
Italian male film actors
Italian male silent film actors
Italian film producers
Italian film directors
Italian male screenwriters
20th-century Italian screenwriters
20th-century Italian male actors
20th-century Italian male writers